Joel Ferry is an American politician and rancher serving as a member of the Utah House of Representatives from the 1st district. Elected in 2018, he assumed office on January 2, 2019.

Early life and education 
Ferry is a native of Box Elder County, Utah and graduated from Box Elder High School in 1996. He earned a Bachelor of Science degree in economics and finance from Utah State University.

Career 
After graduating from college, Ferry worked as a banker at Zions Bancorporation in Salt Lake City. Ferry later returned to Corinne, Utah to work on his family's farm with his father and uncle. Ferry has also served as the chairman of the Box Elder County Republican Party. In 2018, he was elected to the Utah House of Representatives, assuming office on January 2, 2019, and succeeding Scott Sandall. Ferry appeared at the signing ceremony of the 2018 United States farm bill. He has expressed concern about the potential for the Great Salt Lake to dry up, comparing the effect to "a potential environmental nuclear bomb".

In July 2022, Governor Spencer Cox nominated Ferry to serve as Utah Department of Natural Resources. The position requires confirmation by the Utah State Senate.

Personal life 
Ferry and his wife, Becca, have five children. His uncle, Ben Ferry, also served in the Utah House of Representatives.

References 

Living people
People from Box Elder County, Utah
Utah State University alumni
Republican Party members of the Utah House of Representatives
Businesspeople from Utah
21st-century American politicians
Year of birth missing (living people)